Andrew Alan "Drew" Fuller (born May 19, 1980) is an American actor and former model. He is best known for his portrayal of Chris Halliwell in the television series Charmed and for playing soldier Trevor LeBlanc on Lifetime's Army Wives.

Early life
Fuller was born in Atherton, California and grew up in Newport Beach; he has a younger sister, Hilary.

Career
Fuller got his start in modeling after a family friend put him on the cover of UCLA Magazine.
Deciding to wait a few years, Fuller eventually entered the modeling world at age sixteen and quickly became a top model for such companies as Prada, Club Med, and Tommy Hilfiger. He has appeared in many commercials including J.Crew, Subway, Toyota and Pepsi opposite Britney Spears. 
He took part in the music video for The Calling's Wherever You Will Go, playing the new boyfriend of the betrayed teenage girl whose relationship is the subject of the video. He also featured in Jennifer Love Hewitt's 2002 music video "BareNaked".

Fuller became known for playing Chris Halliwell on Charmed, a starring and guest star role from seasons 5-8 of the show. In the series, his character is the second son of Piper (Holly Marie Combs) and Leo (Brian Krause) and engages in time travel to save his older brother Wyatt (Wes Ramsey). Fuller's most recent roles are in The Ultimate Gift, a drama released on March 9, 2007, and in the series Army Wives which airs on Lifetime. He also co-starred in ABC Family's television movie The Circuit.

Fuller has finished filming for an independent feature film, The Kane Files: Life Of Trial.

Fuller made a cameo in the music video "Tired of Being Sorry" for Balthazar Getty's band Ringside.
He also made an appearance in the film Loaded.

Other works: TV commercial for Subway (2003),  appears in the pro-WGA strike video on YouTube "Writer Boi" (2007), writer - Bowlerman Begins (short) (2010).

Filmography

Film

Television

Internet

Music video appearances

References

External links

Drew Fuller fan site - Transcript of October 2003 interview on AOL webcast.

1980 births
American male film actors
Male models from California
American male television actors
Male actors from California
Living people
People from Atherton, California
People from Newport Beach, California